Justin Hanson is an Australian politician who was appointed to the South Australian Legislative Council for the South Australian Branch of the Australian Labor Party on 28 February 2017.

2017 Appointment
Gerry Kandelaars resigned from parliament on 17 February 2017, which created a casual vacancy and subsequent appointment. Hanson filled the vacancy.

2018 Election
Justin Hanson was selected at number 2 on the voting ticket of the Labor Party in the 2018 State Election. A new electoral system applied for the 2018 Legislative Council election, abolishing group voting tickets and allowing voters to express their own preferences for parties above the line. Electoral analyst Antony Green speculated that this had the effect that "Party control over preferences was ended".

At the 2018 State election Labor polled 304,229 Legislative Council votes and Justin was subsequently re-elected to the Legislative Council as a member fifth overall from eleven members elected, and of 43 candidates that year. Justin Hanson has been elected for an eight year term until the 2026 election. 

Justin Hanson received 5.8% or 741 first preference votes of the 12,666 "below the line" votes cast for the Labor party in the 2018 election.

Background
Justin grew up and went to school in the Western Suburbs of Adelaide, later studying at Christian Brothers College. He obtained Law and Arts degrees from the University of Adelaide.

Before entering Parliament Justin was elected as a Councillor in the City of Tea Tree Gully in Balmoral Ward, representing a ward containing the Tea Tree Plaza Westfield as well as over 6000 residences or around 15,000 residents. Tea Tree Gully Council is one of the largest in the State and has an annual budget in excess of 100 million dollars. In addition to his duties to residents, Justin served on several key committees, including as Chair of the Audit Committee.

Justin has qualifications in the Superannuation Industry and has also worked in the South Australian Finance Industry. He was a Director on the Board of Statewide Superannuation – a fund based in South Australia, investing and managing in excess of $8 billion in funds, servicing over 22,000 employers, and with over 140,000 South Australians as members.

He also served for more than a decade as the Legal Officer of the Australian Workers Union in South Australia – mediating disputes and representing employees in the Mining, Grain, Steel, and Local Government industries.

Justin was also a board member and chair at the not-for-profit Neil Sachse Foundation, an organisation dedicated to spinal injury research that has worked together with the South Australian Health & Medical Research Institute (SAHMRI) to research advanced imaging of the spine.

He is passionate about the importance of industry to the South Australian economy and how to involve everyone in it through social and economic inclusion. While in office Justin has spoken against the privatisation or outsourcing of the city trams and trains, any possible sale of SA Pathology, and spoken for the creation of an export-focused manufacturing sector based on renewable energy. He aims to build a stronger and fairer society through the involvement of community leaders. His policy interests include regional development, more efficient and less costly energy, defence industries, and job creation.

Media
Justin Hanson has defended the role of Parliamentary Committees and their ability to accept confidential evidence. Justin Hanson's position was in response to a position put by the Chief Justice of the Courts in South Australia that a Committee report into systemic alleged bullying and harassment in South Australian courts was "prepared to wound but afraid to strike" due to its reliance upon evidence taken confidentially from those who had been bullied and harassed.

Justin Hanson has spoken out about fellow Parliamentarian's and the use of alleged racial abuse during a social function at Parliament House where the aboriginal heritage of fellow Labor party member, the Opposition legal affairs shadow minister Kyam Maher MLC, was allegedly called into question by Liberal party MP Sam Duluk.

Justin Hanson said he had been troubled by the tone of “some media coverage” of the Lehrmann trial, which he said suggested that it was “the accuser who is on trial, rather than the accused”. Justin Hanson particularly condemned a front page headline in local South Australian paper the Advertiser which was "The Rape Divide" as part of this. 

He said, "This disgraceful attitude arises from deeply ingrained misogyny and from a very simple and very regrettable fact: we still don’t believe victims.... we need to stop tolerating headlines and media coverage like that. I will not tolerate it, and if you are listening right now you shouldn’t tolerate it either."

References

Living people
Members of the South Australian Legislative Council
Australian Labor Party members of the Parliament of South Australia
Year of birth missing (living people)
Place of birth missing (living people)
Labor Right politicians
21st-century Australian politicians
Australian trade unionists
Australian republicans
Australian solicitors
University of Adelaide alumni